Sydney Mark Carrington, born 19 August 1961 in Gisborne, is a former New Zealand cricketer who played for Northern Districts in the 1980s. He also played for the Poverty Bay in the Hawke Cup.

References

1961 births
Living people
New Zealand cricketers
Northern Districts cricketers
Cricketers from Gisborne, New Zealand
North Island cricketers